Rosetti and Ryan is an American legal drama television series that aired on NBC from September 22 until November 10, 1977, from 10 to 11 p.m. Eastern Time.

Premise
Legal drama about two completely different lawyers; Rosetti is outgoing and debonair, while Ryan is a former cop who is more low-profile and no-nonsense.

Cast
Tony Roberts as Joe Rosetti
Squire Fridell as Frank Ryan
Jane Elliot as Jessica Hornesby
Ruth Manning as Emma
Randi Oakes as Georgia
Dick O'Neill as Judge Hardcastle
William Marshall as Judge Black

Personnel
Leonard B. Stern, executive producer 
Don M. Mankiewicz and Gordon Cotler, supervising producers
Jerry Davis, producer for Universal Television
John Astin, Harry Falk, and Richard Crenna, directors

Episodes

Pilot

Season 1

Production
The pilot aired May 19, 1977, as a made-for-TV-movie.

References

External links
 

1977 American television series debuts
1977 American television series endings
1970s American legal television series
English-language television shows
NBC original programming
Television series by Universal Television
Television shows set in Massachusetts